Parmops is a genus of flashlight fishes found in the deep waters of the central Pacific Ocean.  P. coruscans is found in the Eastern Pacific around Tahiti and P. echinatus is found in the Western Pacific around Fiji.

Species
There are currently two recognized species in this genus:
 Parmops coruscans Rosenblatt & G. D. Johnson, 1991
 Parmops echinatus G. D. Johnson, Seeto & Rosenblatt, 2001

References

Anomalopidae

Taxa named by Richard Heinrich Rosenblatt
Marine fish genera